The 2013 Glastonbury Festival|Glastonbury Festival of Contemporary Performing Arts was held from 26 to 30 June 2013. It followed a fallow year, in which there was no festival.

Ticket sales
On 20 June 2012 it was announced that tickets for the 2013 festival would go on sale at 9am on Sunday 7 October 2012. All 135,000 tickets were sold in a record 1 hour and 40 minutes.

2013 line-up
The Arctic Monkeys headlined on the Pyramid stage on the Friday night.
The Rolling Stones made their Glastonbury debut, headlining on the Saturday.
The band played twenty songs during their two-hour set, with the second hour broadcast by BBC Two. The Rolling Stones performance had a peak audience of 2.6 million on BBC 2.
Mumford & Sons closed the festival with their first ever headline set on the Pyramid stage.

On 17 January 2013 it was announced that on each day, in an act of solidarity, musicians from Mali would open the Pyramid Stage. Islamists have banned music in the North of the North African nation. The first musician announced to open the Pyramid Stage was Rokia Traoré.

Rodriguez, the Detroit pop star at the center of the Oscar-nominated documentary Searching for Sugar Man, will perform at Glastonbury Festival

The London-based indie group The Vaccines announced on their Facebook page that they would be playing the Pyramid Stage on the Friday.
The lineup was announced on 27 March at 7pm on the Glastonbury website and on the Zane Lowe radio show on BBC Radio 1.

Beady Eye opened the festival with a surprise unadvertised performance on Friday at 11am.

Unconfirmed dates

The Park Stage
 Cat Power
 The Horrors
 Django Django
 Rodriguez
 Dinosaur Jr. 
 Trop Belle. and more

The John Peel Stage
 Crystal Castles
 Hurts
 Phoenix
 Everything Everything
 The Courteeners
 Prāta vētra and more
 Miles Kane

BBC Introducing
Turrentine Jones
Rizzle Kicks
Gabrielle Aplin

Avalon Stage

Josh Doyle
Newton Faulkner

References

External links

BBC Glastonbury Festival coverage
Official website

2013 in British music
2013 in England
2010s in Somerset
2013
June 2013 events in the United Kingdom